Cole Glacier is a glacier on the east side of Godfrey Upland,  long, flowing north-northeast into the Traffic Circle, in southern Graham Land. It was first seen by the United States Antarctic Service in 1940, but not named. It was roughly surveyed by the Falkland Islands Dependencies Survey in 1958, and named by the UK Antarctic Place-Names Committee after Humfray Cole, the most famous English instrument maker of Elizabethan times, who pioneered the design of portable navigation instruments and equipped Martin Frobisher's expeditions.

References 

Glaciers of Graham Land
Bowman Coast